The Flathead Range is a mountain range of the Canadian Rockies in Alberta and British Columbia, Canada. It is located on the Continental Divide, east of Fernie, in the Kootenay Land District. It stretches 27 kilometers (17 miles) lengthwise north–south from Crowsnest Pass to North Kootenay Pass. The range's toponym was officially adopted by the Geographic Board of Canada 30 June 1912, and was named in association with the Flathead River.

Summits

See also
 Ranges of the Canadian Rockies

References

External links

 Flathead Range: weather forecast

Ranges of the Canadian Rockies
Mountain ranges of Alberta
Mountain ranges of British Columbia